The Central Moldavian Plateau, or Codru Massif is a geographic area in Moldova. It is the central and SE part of the Moldavian Plateau. It has elevations that in the N-S direction decrease in altitude from 400 m to under 200 m. 

The Central Moldavian Plateau is composed of:

 Ciuluc-Soloneţ Hills, the north along the right side of the Răut river, 1,690 km²
 Corneşti Hills, also known as Cordi Hills, 4,740 km²
 Lower Dniester Hills, or South Bessarabia Plateau (Podişul Basarabiei de Sud), to the south of the Botna river, 3,040 km²
 Tigheci Hills, in the south along the left side of the Prut river, 3,550 km²
 between the latter and the Prut river lies the Lower Prut Valley, 1,810 km²

The natural vegetation of the Central Moldavian Plateau is characterized by forests, known as Codru (singular) or Codri (plural). It is also an area proper for vineyards.

Bibliography
 Concept of National Ecological Network of the Republic of Moldova

Plateaus of Moldova